Kramp is a surname. Notable people with the surname include:

Christian Kramp (1760–1826), French mathematician who worked primarily with factorials
Daryl Kramp (born 1947), Canadian politician
Paul L. Kramp (1887–1975), Danish zoologist who worked extensively on jellyfish